Tijnje is a village in the municipality of Opsterland in the east of Friesland, the Netherlands. It had a population of around 1,510 in January 2017.

There are two windmills in the village, Boezemmolen and De Deelen. The latter is a tjasker.

History 
The village was first mentioned in 1718 as "Winie Tinie, Luxter Tinie", and means "willow braided fence". Tijnje developed around 1870 as a peat excavation village. The Dutch Reformed church was built in 1890. The Reformed Churches is a concrete building from 1921, and is an early concrete building.

Tijnje was home to 14 people in 1840. The local car dealer started a collection of old Opel cars. The collection of  55 cars is at display at the Opel Oldtimer museum in Tijnje.

Gallery

References

External links

Populated places in Friesland
Geography of Opsterland